Hartmut Haberland (born February 3, 1948 in Hanover, Germany) is a German linguist and was a professor at Roskilde University in Denmark. 

In 1977, he founded the Journal of Pragmatics together with Jacob Mey. Currently, he is an editor of Pragmatics and Society together with Mey (Chief editor), Hermine Penz and Hans Jørgen Ladegaard, and an editor of Acta Linguistica Hafniensia, the journal of the Linguistic Circle of Copenhagen together with Lars Heltoft, Janus Mortensen, Sune Sønderberg Mortensen and Peter Juul Nielsen.

In 2005, Haberland became a Danish citizen.

Haberland's textbook Soziologie + Linguistik. Die schlechte Aufhebung sozialer Ungleichheit durch Sprache from 1973 was used in Europe as his first work with widespread recognition.

The launch of Journal of Pragmatics (with co-editor Jacob L. Mey) went against the Chomskyan perspectives on linguistics at the time, which eschewed pragmatics or other aspects of language use confining them to a wastebasket (The Journal of Pragmatics did not take this garbage from the wastebasket to recycle it, but thought that language use in itself deserved being studied systematically). In fact, many seminal articles were published there, among which contributions by Asa Kasher, Raymond Gibbs, Frans van Eemeren and R Grootendorst, Yan Huang, Alessandro Ferrara, Mira Ariel, Rachel Giora, Sarah Blackwell, Alessandro Capone, Neal Norrick, Gunter Kress, Theodossia Pavlidou, Sophia Marmaridou, Richard Janney, Jef Verschueren, Johan van der Auwera, Sachiko Ide.

Haberland has also done important work in the area of language contact and the domains of certain languages. In particular, he created attention to the influence of English on the Danish language in terms of power and ideology, through concepts on hegemony and globalization.

Career
Haberland graduated with an MA from Freie Universität Berlin in 1971. After teaching at Freie Universität Berlin he took a job at Roskilde University in 1974, first as an Associate Professor and then as a Senior Reader. Since 2012, he was professor of German language and the sociolinguistics of globalisation. He retired in 2018.

Haberland taught in Berlin (Freie Universität) 1972-1974, and in Roskilde since 1974 (in Düsseldorf 1979-1980). 

He has been a guest professor, researcher or summer school professor in Athens (1993), Soka (Japan) (1995), Beijing (1996), Guangzhou (2006), Osaka (2009) and Hong Kong (2010).

References

Bibliography
Gramsci, A. (1992–6). Prison notebooks, I-II. Ed. and trans. J. A. Buttigieg (Trans. A. Callari. European perspectives: A series in social thought and cultural criticism). New York, NY: Columbia University Press.
Hager, F., Haberland, H., & Paris, R. (1973). Soziologie + Linguistik. Die schlechte Aufhebung sozialer Ungleichheit durch Sprache. Stuttgart, Germany: Metzler.

Linguists from Germany
Linguists of Danish
1948 births
Living people
Writers from Hanover
Academic staff of Roskilde University
Free University of Berlin alumni
German expatriates in Denmark